The following lists events that happened during 1908 in Australia.

Incumbents

Monarch – Edward VII
Governor-General – Henry Northcote, 1st Baron Northcote (until 9 September), then William Ward, 2nd Earl of Dudley
Prime Minister –  Alfred Deakin (until 13 November), then Andrew Fisher
Chief Justice – Samuel Griffith

State premiers
Premier of New South Wales – Charles Wade
Premier of South Australia – Thomas Price
Premier of Queensland –  Robert Philp (until 18 February), then William Kidston
Premier of Tasmania – John Evans
Premier of Western Australia – Newton Moore
Premier of Victoria – (Sir) Thomas Bent

State governors
Governor of New South Wales – Admiral Sir Harry Rawson
Governor of South Australia – Sir George Ruvthen Le Hunte
Governor of Queensland – Frederic Thesiger, 3rd Baron Chelmsford
Governor of Tasmania – Sir Gerald Strickland
Governor of Western Australia – Admiral Sir Frederick Bedford
Governor of Victoria – Major General Sir Reginald Talbot (until 6 July), then Sir Thomas Gibson-Carmichael (from 27 July)

Events

10 March – Australians Douglas Mawson and Edgeworth David accompanied by Ernest Shackleton and others are the first people to scale Mount Erebus in Antarctica.
 30 March – Commonwealth Quarantine service came into operation and took over quarantine stations in every state.
20 April – 44 are killed and 400 injured in the Sunshine train disaster.
7 May  – The Coat of Arms of Australia are granted Royal Assent.
August – Boys in Australia first participated in the scouting movement, within a year of scouting starting in England
20 August – The Great White Fleet, the first visit by the U.S. Navy to Australia, arrives in Sydney.
8 October – The capital of Australia is chosen, settling a feud between rivals Melbourne and Sydney.
13 November – The Australian Labor Party withdraws its support for the minority government of Prime Minister Alfred Deakin, forcing his replacement with Andrew Fisher.
18 November – The Victorian government passes the Adult Suffrage Bill 1908, granting female suffrage for the first time.
15 December – The Invalid and Old Age Pensions Act is passed, which sets up a national aged pension scheme (except for aliens, Aboriginals and naturalized Asiatics not born in Australia)
29 December – A general election is held in Victoria. The government of Sir Thomas Bent is returned to power.

Science and technology
1 January – The Commonwealth Bureau of Meteorology formally commences operation.
3 February – first trans-Tasman radio transmission (via HMS Powerful in Tasman Sea)

Arts and literature

16 May – The Commonwealth Literary Fund is established.
 Henry Handel Richardson's first novel Maurice Guest is published
We of the Never Never by Mrs Aeneas Gunn is published
 The poem My Country by Dorothea Mackellar first published

Film
2 February – The Limelight Department of the Salvation Army films Grand Memorial Service, a film of the funeral of Major Kenneth McLeod, the Director of the Bayswater Boys' Home. The funeral was held at the Kew Cemetery in Melbourne.

Sport
31 January – Victoria wins the 1907–08 Sheffield Shield.
11 February – Australia regains The Ashes with a 308 run victory over England.
20 April – The first New South Wales Rugby League premiership begins in Sydney.
July - The 1908 Interstate rugby league series sees the first ever matches between New South Wales and Queensland
29 August – South Sydney win the grand final to become the first NSWRFL premiers
3 November – Lord Nolan wins the Melbourne Cup.
At the 1908 Summer Olympics held in London, Australia forms a team with New Zealand and competes as Australasia.  They win a gold medal for rugby football, a silver medal for middleweight boxing, and in swimming a silver medal for men's 400-metre freestyle and bronze medal for men's 1500 metre freestyle  – both won by Frank Beaurepaire.
Australia's national rugby league team sets sail for England on the 1908–09 Kangaroo tour of Great Britain.

Births
23 February – William McMahon, 20th Prime Minister of Australia (died 1988)
15 May – Kevin Ellis, NSW politician (died 1975)
20 May – Henry Bolte, Premier of Victoria (died 1990)
10 July – John Armstrong, ALP senator (died 1977)
5 August – Harold Holt, 17th Prime Minister of Australia (died 1967)
10 August – Rica Erickson, Australian botanist (died 2009)
26 August – Alexandra Hasluck, author and social historian (died 1993)
27 August – Donald Bradman, cricketer (died 2001)
10 September – Angus Bethune, Premier of Tasmania (died 2004)
17 October – Wally Prigg, rugby league player (died 1980)
3 November – Eddie Scarf, boxer and wrestler (died 1980)

Deaths

 14 February – David Syme, newspaper proprietor (b. 1827)
 29 February – John Hope, 7th Earl of Hopetoun, 1st Governor-General of Australia (born in the United Kingdom and died in France) (b. 1860)
 7 March – Alfred William Howitt, anthropologist, explorer, and naturalist (born in the United Kingdom) (b. 1830)
 23 March – Alexander Paterson, Queensland politician (born in the United Kingdom) (b. 1844)
 11 May – Charles Kingston, 20th Premier of South Australia (b. 1850)
 20 October – Vaiben Louis Solomon, 21st Premier of South Australia (b. 1853)
 14 November – Ernest Favenc, explorer, journalist and author (born in the United Kingdom) (b. 1845)
 18 November – Pierce Galliard Smith, cleric (born in the United Kingdom) (b. 1826)

See also
 List of Australian films before 1910

References

 
Australia
Years of the 20th century in Australia